Shin Ming Estate is a public housing estate in Tiu Keng Leng, Tseung Kwan O, New Territories, Hong Kong, near Metro Town and MTR Tiu Keng Leng station. It consists of two housing blocks housing 2,000 flats completed in 2011.

Houses

Demographics
According to the 2016 by-census, Shin Ming Estate had a population of 4,002. The median age was 46.8 and the majority of residents (99.5 per cent) were of Chinese ethnicity. The average household size was 2.1 people. The median monthly household income of all households (i.e. including both economically active and inactive households) was HK$13,250.

Politics
Shin Ming Estate is located in Do Shin constituency of the Sai Kung District Council. It is currently represented by Cheung Chin-pang, who was elected in the 2019 elections.

See also

Public housing estates in Tseung Kwan O

References

Public housing estates in Hong Kong
Residential buildings completed in 2011
Tiu Keng Leng
Tseung Kwan O